Drozdovo is a rural locality (a village) in Krasnoselskoye Rural Settlement, Yuryev-Polsky District, Vladimir Oblast, Russia. The population was 111 as of 2010.

Geography 
Drozdovo is located 6 km southwest of Yuryev-Polsky (the district's administrative centre) by road. Poyelovo is the nearest rural locality.

References 

Rural localities in Yuryev-Polsky District